SCSI target devices provide a number of SCSI log pages.  These can be interrogated by a Log Sense command and in some cases can be set by a Log Select command.  The Log Sense and Log Select commands include a 6-bit address field, allowing for 64 possible log pages.  There is a standard map of log page addresses below.  Note that any given SCSI device type will only support a subset of these log pages.

00h - supported log pages
01h - buffer over-run/under-run
02h - error counter (write)
03h - error counter (read)
04h - error counter (read reverse)
05h - error counter (verify)
06h - non-medium error
07h - last n error events
08h-2Fh - reserved
30h-3Eh - vendor-specific
3Fh - reserved

SCSI